Bernard Lo is a Canadian television anchor who was a longtime host for CNBC Asia and Bloomberg Television.

Biography
Bernard Lo was a Hong Kong-based anchor for CNBC Asia and also hosted news and talk show programs for Bloomberg Television for many years.  After working for many years in local English language television news in Hong Kong and Singapore, he joined CNBC as part of the Asia startup team in 1994.

Bernie as he’s known by to friends and family earned an Associate of Arts and Sciences degree from Tacoma Community College (1985), a Bachelor of Arts from The Evergreen State College (1987) and a Masters of Science from the University of Idaho (1990).

He speaks Cantonese fluently, has been a permanent resident of Hong Kong since 1990, and is married to Wong Sze Man whom he met in Hong Kong in the early 90’s. They are raising their 3 year old calico domestic shorthair girl Mia and were parents to Mike, George and Max their adopted fur sons who were deeply loved and missed every day.

Bernie was born in Vancouver, British Columbia but only lived there for a few months. His father moved the family to Corvallis, Oregon where he took a teaching post at Oregon State University. Bernie’s brothers Ken and Tony were born during the family’s 12 years in Corvallis.  The Lo’s then moved to Tacoma, Washington where Bernie attended junior high, high school and community college.  His A.A.S. from TCC and B.A. from Evergreen are in Liberal Arts while his M.S. from University of Idaho is a hybrid degree in business and performing arts management.  Bernie was an accomplished violinist during his teens and college years and performed at a professional level as section violin with the Boise Philharmonic.

He started his broadcast career in Hong Kong with local Hong Kong station ATV, moved to TVB, then hosted a business news magazine “Money Mind” with the Television Corporation of Singapore,  before joining CNBC. After CNBC and Asia Business News merged their operations in early 1998, Bernard rejoined the new CNBC Asia Pacific. After 10 years with CNBC Asia, he anchored for Bloomberg Television for 7 years before returning to CNBC Asia in early 2010.

Bernie won the Best Current Affairs Presenter trophy at the 2000 Asian Television Awards, and won the same award in 2011. He won the Best News Anchor Award at the same awards in 2013, and won the Silver Medal for Best Anchor at the New York Festivals Film and Television Awards in 2014.

Bernie began suffering spine problems in early 2015 and underwent several operations that year and in subsequent years. He suffered a severe vertebral collapse in mid-2018 during failed artificial disc replacement surgery and despite several additional surgeries since has been unable to return to air. He is currently ambulatory but is disabled by severe pain due to continued spine deterioration and is seeking further surgical intervention.

He continues to seek medical help and still hopes to return to television news.

References

Year of birth missing (living people)
Bloomberg L.P. people
Living people
Canadian expatriates in Hong Kong
Canadian people of Chinese descent
Canadian television hosts
Canadian television journalists
Hong Kong television presenters
Journalists from British Columbia
University of Idaho alumni
People from Vancouver